In Finland, Kotiranta and Niemelä (1993, 1996) introduced a widely used method for comparing the conservation values of different forest areas, based on the observation that certain wood-rotting fungi are very sensitive to the impact of human activities on forest ecosystems. Such species are slow to return to areas from where they have disappeared, so their presence is evidence of a long continuity in forest ecosystems.

Kotiranta-Niemelä polypore indicators 

Kotiranta and Niemelä divide the indicator species into two categories: old forest species predominantly found in old natural forests (20 species); and virgin forest species (13 species), which are almost totally restricted to undisturbed old-growth forests with a long ecological continuum stretching way back into the past. Separate species lists are available for spruce (Picea abies) dominated forests and for pine (Pinus sylvestris) forests. Old spruce and pine dominated forests include smaller amounts of various tree species (e.g. Betula spp., Populus tremula, Salix caprea) which, too, are an important element of forest structure. Therefore, some fungi specialized to grow on these substrates are also included in the lists of indicators. Special attention has been paid to fungi growing on the so-called kelo trees.

Indicator fungi were selected to the list keeping in mind that they should not be too difficult to identify, and should not include taxonomic pitfalls. To minimize the effects of accidental single omissions of observations, the number of the so-called indicator species was kept fairly high. Most of these indicator fungi are polypores (bracket fungi).

When assessing and comparing different forest areas, inventories are made in each area separately. Every old-forest species present is then given a numerical value of 1, and every virgin-forest species a value of 2.

The total sums of these numbers can be used as reference values for each area as follows:

 10–19 Valuable areas from a conservation point of view,
 20–29 Very valuable areas,
 30–46 Exceptionally valuable areas.

This rating is fairly strict. Forests managed according to standard practices in Finland usually get a numerical value of 0, or seldom 1–4. These lists of indicator species are widely used in Finland while establishing or enlarging national parks and other protected forests, especially by the governmental Forest and Park Service.

Indicator species, spruce dominated forests

Old forest species 

 Anomoporia bombycina
 Antrodia pulvinascens
 Asterodon ferruginosus
 Crustoderma dryinum
 Fomitopsis rosea
 Gloiodon strigosus
 Leptoporus mollis
 Pelloporus leporinus (Onnia l.)
 Perenniporia subacida
 Phaeolus schweinitzii
 Phellinus abietis
 Phellinus ferrugineofuscus
 Phellinus lundellii
 Phellinus nigrolimitatus
 Phellinus viticola
 Postia guttulata
 Postia lateritia
 Pycnoporellus fulgens
 Rhodonia placenta
 Skeletocutis odora

Virgin forest species 
 Amylocystis lapponica
 Antrodia albobrunnea
 Antrodia crassa
 Antrodia infirma
 Antrodiella citrinella
 Cystostereum murrayi
 Diplomitoporus crustulinus
 Junghuhnia collabens (Steccherinum c.)
 Laurilia sulcata
 Lepiota lignicola (Leucopholiota decorosa)
 Phlebia centrifuga
 Sidera lenis (Skeletocutis l.)
 Skeletocutis stellae

Indicator species, pine dominated forests

Old forests 

 Anomoporia kamtschatica
 Chaetodermella luna
 Crustoderma dryinum
 Irpicodon pendulus
 Junghuhnia luteoalba (Steccherinum l.)
 Leptoporus mollis
 Meruliopsis taxicola
 Odonticium romellii
 Oligoporus sericeomollis
 Phaeolus schweinitzii
 Phellinus nigrolimitatus
 Phellinus pini
 Phellinus viticola
 Phlebia cretacea
 Phlebia serialis
 Postia lateritia
 Postia leucomallella
 Pseudomerulius aureus
 Sistotremastrum suecicum
 Sparassis crispa

Virgin forests 

 Antrodia albobrunnea
 Antrodia crassa
 Antrodia infirma
 Antrodia primaeva
 Crustoderma corneum (Phlebia c.)
 Dichomitus squalens
 Gloeophyllum protractum
 Hyphodontia curvispora
 Postia parva
 Sidera lenis (Skeletocutis l.)
 Skeletocutis jelicii
 Skeletocutis stellae
 Tyromyces canadensis

Other indicator fungi schemes 

Also Bonsdorff et al. (2014) have published lists of mushrooms and other terrestrial macrofungi that indicate the biodiversity of various forest types in Finland.

References 

Fungus ecology
Forest pathology
Lists of biota of Finland